Dreamboats and Petticoats is a 2007 compilation album composed of songs from the 1950s and early 1960s. The compilation remained on the UK Top 40 Compilitation Chart for a total of 157 weeks. Its success led to a series of six similarly themed follow-up compilation albums being released. The series also includes a "Summer Holidays" album (which includes the Cliff Richard and the Shadows song after which it is named), a Christmas album, and a "Best of Del Shannon" album called Runaway.

Track listing of the original compilation album

Disc 1
 Marty Wilde - Teenager in Love
 John Leyton - Johnny Remember Me
 Billy Fury - Halfway to Paradise
 Buddy Holly - Heartbeat
 Roy Orbison - Only the Lonely
 Johnnie Ray - Just Walking in the Rain
 Mike Sarne & Wendy Richard - Come Outside
 Craig Douglas - Only 16
 Joe Brown - That's What Love Will Do
 The Big Bopper - Chantilly Lace
 Mark Wynter - Go Away Little Girl
 The Platters - Smoke Gets in Your Eyes
 The Allisons - Are You Sure?
 The Everly Brothers - All I Have to Do Is Dream
 Skeeter Davis - The End of the World
 Brenda Lee - All Alone Am I
 The Marcels - Blue Moon
 Chuck Berry - Sweet Little Sixteen
 Kenny Lynch - Up on the Roof
 Bobby Vee - Take Good Care of My Baby
 Terry Dene - A White Sport Coat
 Johnny Burnette - You're Sixteen
 Connie Francis - Lipstick on Your Collar
 Kathy Kirby - Secret Love
 Bobby Darin- Dream Lover
 The Cascades - Rhythm of the Rain

Disc 2
 Bill Haley And His Comets - Rock Around the Clock
 Cliff Richard - Move It
 Adam Faith - What Do You Want
 Buddy Holly - It Doesn't Matter Anymore
 Joe Brown - Picture of You
 Mark Wynter - Venus in Blue Jeans
 Chuck Berry - You Never Can Tell
 Bobby Vee - Rubber Ball
 Susan Maughan - Bobby's Girl
 Lonnie Donegan - Rock Island Line
 Dion DiMucci - Runaround Sue
 Gene Vincent And His Blue Caps - Be Bop A Lula
 Del Shannon - Runaway
 Little Eva - The Loco-Motion
 Helen Shapiro - Walking Back to Happiness
 Pat Boone - Love Letters in the Sand
 John Leyton - Wild Wind
 Del Shannon - Little Town Flirt
 Billy Fury - Like I've Never Been Gone
 Heinz - Just Like Eddie
 Eddie Cochran - Three Steps to Heaven
 Neil Sedaka - Oh! Carol
 Bobby Vinton - Blue Velvet
 Duane Eddy & the Rebels - Because They're Young
 The Tornados - Telstar
 The Shadows - Wonderful Land

References 

2007 compilation albums